Spatuloricaria nudiventris is a species of catfish in the family Loricariidae. It is native to South America, where it occurs in the São Francisco River basin in Brazil. The species reaches 20.4 cm (8 inches) in standard length.

References 

Loricariidae
Species described in 1840
Fish of the São Francisco River basin
Catfish of South America
Taxa named by Achille Valenciennes